USS Harding (DD-91) was a  in the United States Navy during World War I. She was the first ship named in honor of Seth Harding.

Launched in 1918, she undertook training exercises off the East Coast of the United States sporadically for several years. In 1919, she escorted a major transatlantic flight of Curtiss NC seaplane. Later that year, she was selected to be converted into a seaplane tender, and was then used to support naval aviator training off Naval Air Station Pensacola. She was decommissioned in 1922 and sold for scrapping in 1936.

Design and construction 

Harding was one of 111 s built by the United States Navy between 1917 and 1919. She, along with seven of her sisters, were constructed at Union Iron Works shipyards in San Francisco, California using specifications and detail designs drawn up by Bethlehem Steel.

She was armed with four 4"/50 caliber guns, three .30 caliber machine guns, and twelve torpedo tubes  Mark 15 torpedoes. She had a regular crew complement of 122 officers and enlisted men. She was driven by two Curtis steam turbines powered by four Yarrow boilers.

Specifics on Hardings performance are not known, but she was one of the group of Wickes-class destroyers known unofficially as the 'Liberty Type' to differentiate them from the destroyers constructed from detail designs drawn up by Bath Iron Works, which used Parsons or Westinghouse turbines. The 'Liberty' type destroyers deteriorated badly in service, and in 1929 all 60 of this group were retired by the Navy. The class also suffered problems with turning and weight.

Harding was the first ship to be named for Seth Harding.

Service history
Harding was launched on 4 July 1918 from Union Iron Works. She was sponsored by the wife of George A. Armes, and embarked under the command of Commander Henry D. Cooke. On 3 February 1919, she was assigned to the United States Atlantic Fleet and sailed for Newport, Rhode Island via Santa Cruz, California. Transiting the Panama Canal, she arrived on 18 February. Two days later she moved to Boston, Massachusetts and stood out of that harbor on 21 February, to escort  which was transporting President Woodrow Wilson from the Versailles Conference. Two days later she participated in ceremonies in Boston harbor celebrating the arrival of that ship.

Next, she put in for repairs at Norfolk, Virginia until 8 March, when she left for fleet exercises near Cuba. Following this, Harding left for New York, arriving there on 14 April. On 1 May, she departed as part of a group of destroyers acting as a guide for a flight of Navy Curtiss NC seaplanes across the Atlantic Ocean. Harding provided searchlight illumination by night during the first part of the flight; NC-1 and NC-3 made forced landings near the Azores and Harding rendered assistance to NC-1 before it sank. NC-4, the remaining seaplane, arrived at Ponta Delgada 20 May and as she took off for the last leg of her journey, Harding got underway to provide radio compass signals at sea. After the seaplanes landed at Plymouth, England, to complete the flight on 31 May 1919, Harding visited Brest, France and the Azores before returning to Newport 18 June. For several months, Harding was based out of Newport and Norfolk on training exercises.

After the end of World War I, the U.S. Navy began to convert surplus ships to support its growing seaplane tender program. Several steamers and minelayers were selected in 1919, but Harding was the only destroyer, because it was determined that she would require minimal modifications. Following this success, and as aircraft carrier designs advanced, more ships were designed specifically to support naval aviation. Fourteen Clemson-class destroyers were converted to seaplane tenders in 1938 when it was determined that aircraft production was outpacing the development of these ships. During the conversion of Harding, her three .30 caliber machine guns were removed and her crew complement was reduced to 100 officers and enlisted men. Her torpedo tubes may also have been removed. On 13 December 1919, she reported to the Philadelphia Navy Yard for conversion to a seaplane tender. She completed the conversion at Charleston Navy Yard and on 20 May 1920, she sailed for duty at Pensacola Naval Air Station. Immediately after this, though, Harding was loaded with medical supplies from the American Red Cross and was ordered to Veracruz, Mexico, where an outbreak of bubonic plague necessitated serum and other supplies. She reached Veracruz on 9 June 1920 and unloaded her supplies. She then steamed for Pensacola, Florida, stopping at Tampico on the way, and arrived in Florida on 13 June.

At Pensacola, Harding was assigned to a seaplane pilot training program. She remained there until 4 August 1920, after which she operated in the Caribbean area tending seaplanes until 23 February 1921. She stopped briefly at Philadelphia before heading to Hampton Roads to support bombing tests on surrendered German ships, leaving Norfolk on 21 June. Harding was detached from this duty the next day.

Harding subsequently conducted training exercises out of Newport and other East Coast ports until 27 December 1921, when she arrived at Charleston, South Carolina. Remaining there until 3 April 1922, she sailed to Philadelphia where she decommissioned 1 July 1922. Harding was then sold for scrap on 29 September 1936, to Schiavone-Bonomo Corporation in New York City.

Notes

Sources

External links
 NavSource Photos

 

Wickes-class destroyers
Ships built in San Francisco
1918 ships